Year 1425 (MCDXXV) was a common year starting on Monday (link will display the full calendar) of the Julian calendar.

Events 
 November 9 – Kale Kye-Taung Nyo becomes King of Ava by having his lover, Queen Shin Bo-Me, assassinate his 8-year-old nephew, King Min Hla.
 December 9 – The Old University of Leuven, Belgium is founded.
 Date unknown
 The Maltese people rise up against Don Gonsalvo Monroy, count of Malta. The insurgents repel an attempt by the Viceroy of Sicily to bring the island to order. The Maltese do not submit to Catalan-Aragonese rule, until the Magna Charta Libertatis, granting them their new rights, is delivered to them.
 Beijing, capital of China, becomes the largest city in the world, taking the lead from Nanjing (estimated date).
 By this year, paper currency in China is worth only 0.025% to 0.014% of its original value in the 14th century; this, and the counterfeiting of copper coin currency, will lead to a dramatic shift to using silver as the common medium of exchange in China.
 Sharafuddin Ali Yazdi's critical history of Persia, Zafar Nama, is completed under the auspices of Mirza Ibrahim Sultan, grandson of Timur.

Births 
 January 5 – Henry IV of Castile (d. 1474)
 March 21 – Henry Beauchamp, 1st Duke of Warwick, English nobleman (d. 1446)
 March 31 – Bianca Maria Visconti, Duchess of Milan (d. 1468)
 April 30 – William III, Landgrave of Thuringia (1445–1482) and Duke of Luxembourg (1457–1482) (d. 1482)
 October 14 – Alesso Baldovinetti, Italian painter (d. 1499)
 November 18 – Kunigunde of Sternberg, first spouse of King George of Podebrady (d. 1449)
 date unknown
 Edmund Sutton, English nobleman (d. 1483)
 Krokodeilos Kladas, Greek military leader (d. 1490) 
 Xicotencatl I, ruler of Tizatlan (in modern-day Mexico) (d. 1522)

Deaths 
 January 18 – Edmund Mortimer, 5th Earl of March, English politician (b. 1391)
 February 27 – Prince Vasily I of Moscow (b. 1371)
 March 17 – Ashikaga Yoshikazu, Japanese shōgun (b. 1407)
 May 24 – Murdoch Stewart, 2nd Duke of Albany, Scottish politician (b. 1362)
 May 29 – Hongxi Emperor of China (b. 1378)
 July 8 – Lady Elizabeth FitzAlan, English noble (b. 1366)
 July 21 – Manuel II Palaiologos, Byzantine Emperor (b. 1350)
 August 22 – Eleanor, Princess of Asturias (b. 1423)
 September 8 – King Charles III of Navarre (b. 1361)
 date unknown
 Madhava of Sangamagrama, Indian mathematician (b. 1350)
 Margareta, Swedish Sami missionary (b. 1369) 
 Yi Jong Mu, Korean general (b. 1360)
 Parameshvara, Indian mathematician (b. 1360)

References